Aire libre is a 2014 Argentine drama film directed by Anahí Berneri. It has been selected to be screened in the Contemporary World Cinema section at the 2014 Toronto International Film Festival.

Synopsis 
It is about the story of a married couple with a son whose relationship has begun to decay. In order to rebuild their relationship, they decide to start a project on the outskirts of the city. They sell their house and go to live at Lucia's parents' house. But the pressures are many and could end up separating them.

Cast
 Leonardo Sbaraglia
 Celeste Cid
 Anahi Beholi

References

External links
 

2014 films
2014 drama films
Argentine drama films
2010s Spanish-language films
2010s Argentine films